Thirteen Day Getaway is the second and final studio album by the punk rock band CIV. It was released on April 7, 1998, on Atlantic Records. The album is dedicated to Raybeez.

Critical reception
The Plain Dealer wrote that "Civ's clean, moderately paced, somewhat melodic pop punk, topped by Anthony Civorelli's monotonous, nasal vocals, makes the group sound like hundreds of other post-Green Day pop punk bands." The San Diego Union-Tribune called the album "top-loaded with songs that suggest CIV knows how to spike pop hooks with a punk charge, to use melody rather than refuse it."

Track listing
"Secondhand Superstar" – 2:44
"Big Girl" – 2:49
"Itchycoo Park" – 2:21
"Haven't Been Myself in a While" – 2:36
"Everyday" – 3:08
"Shout It" – 2:30
"Owner's Manual" – :34
"Something Special" – 2:38
"Using Someone Else" – 2:17
"It's Not Your Fault" – 2:22
"Living Life" – 2:00
"Ordinary" – 2:40
"Little Men" – 3:31
"What Happened to the Grunge?" (Hidden track) – 3:14

Personnel
CIV
CIV (Anthony Civarelli) - Vocals
Charlie Garriga - Guitar/Backing Vocals
Arthur Smilios - Bass/Backing Vocals
Sammy Siegler - Drums

Production
Michael Barbiero - Producer, Mixing
Greg Calbi - Mastering
John Goodmanson - Producer, Engineer, Mixing
Steve Thompson - Producer, Mixing
Mark Mitchell - Mixing Assistant
Scott Gormley - Assistant Engineer
Brian Sperber - Mixing Assistant
Eva Mueller - Photography
Chip Verspyck - Assistant Engineer
Ian Love - Engineer

References 

1998 albums
CIV (band) albums
Atlantic Records albums
Albums produced by John Goodmanson